HC Tiroler Wasserkraft Innsbruck is an Austrian professional ice hockey team in the ICE Hockey League (ICEHL). They play their home games at OlympiaWorld Innsbruck complex in Innsbruck.

History
The club was founded in 1994 as HC Innsbruck and in 1999 with the introduction of wealthy sponsor "Tyrolean Hydropower" were renamed to HC Tiroler Wasserkraft Innsbruck. Since the 2000–01 season the Sharks were playing in the highest Austrian league and was the first Innsbruck team in the first division since the exit of EV Innsbruck upon completion of the 1992–93 season.

Over the years, the team reached the semi-finals on multiple occasions, however, never made it to the finals. In recent seasons, the majority of the squad has often been replaced, but this was reflected on the budget constraints. In addition, the team failed to win in the final stages of the season, year after year, repeated regularly and culminated in the early playoff exits.

On 3 March 2009, Innsbruck announced its intention to leave the Erste Bank Hockey League for financial reasons and resume play in the second tier, the Austrian National League.

Their return season in the new league was completed with a successful squad that consisted mainly of young Tyrolean players. The club finished the regular season first, seven points ahead of the runner-up Dornbirner EC. In the final Innsbruck were defeated by the Vorarlbergians, losing the series 3 games to 1. Two years later, the club succeeded in winning the second division National League Championship, for the first time in franchise history. A short time later it was announced that Innsbruck would return to the top-flight EBEL league.

Venue
The Innsbruck Sharks' home games are played at the OlympiaWorld Innsbruck complex, which hosted the Winter Olympic Games in 1964 and 1976. Innsbruck have the luxury to play at two home venues within the complex, after first primarily using the Olympiahalle Innsbruck which seated approximately 8,000, which was renovated for the 2005 IIHF World Championship.

In 2005, the Sharks moved to also play in the smaller capacity and purpose built Tyrolean Ice Arena which seats 3,200. The Olympiahalle is now used sparingly, specially to cater for larger crowds on important rival games or playoff games.

Players

Current roster

Updated 23 January 2023.

|}

References

External links
 HC TWK Innsbruck official site
 HC TWK Innsbruck Fan Forum (Haie)

Ice hockey teams in Austria
Austrian Hockey League teams
Austrian National League teams
Ice hockey clubs established in 1994
1994 establishments in Austria